Boricyrtinus nilseni is a species of beetle in the family Cerambycidae, and the only species in the genus Boricyrtinus. It was described by Micheli in 2003.

References

Cyrtinini
Beetles described in 2003
Monotypic Cerambycidae genera